The following is a season-by-season list of people who have worked on Vancouver Canucks local radio and television broadcasts.

Key: * - Simulcast on both television and radio

Television

2020s

2010s

2000s

1990s

1980s

1970s

Radio

2020s

2010s

2000s

1990s

1980s

1970s

See also
 List of current National Hockey League broadcasters

 
Vancouver Canucks
Sportsnet